Phillyrea latifolia, commonly known as green olive tree or mock privet, is a species of tree in the family Oleaceae. It is native to the Mediterranean Basin, from Morocco and Portugal in the west, to the Levant in the east.

References

Oleeae
Taxa named by Carl Linnaeus
Flora of Malta
Flora of the Mediterranean Basin